Socialist Youth of Spain is the youth organisation of the Spanish Socialist Workers' Party (PSOE) in Spain. Headquartered in Madrid, the organization was founded in 1906 and is aligned internationally with the Young European Socialists and the International Union of Socialist Youth.

Autonomous from the PSOE, one of the distinguishing marks of the organization is the demand for the Republic in Spain.

References

External links
 Official homepage of Juventudes Socialistas 

Spanish Socialist Workers' Party
Youth wings of political parties in Spain
Youth wings of social democratic parties
1906 establishments in Spain